Shenzhen Media Group a Chinese company which own 12 TV channels and four radio stations.

SZR may also refer to:
 Foreign Intelligence Service of Ukraine in Ukraine
 Sheikh Zayed Road in Dubai, United Arab Emirates
 Slovenský Zväz Rádioamatérov, an amateur radio organization in Slovakia